Grass pink is a common name for several flowering plant taxa:

 Calopogon, a genus of the Orchidaceae
 A species of pink, Dianthus plumarius, of the Caryophyllaceae